Cerovec Stanka Vraza is a village in the Municipality of Ormož in northeastern Slovenia. The area traditionally belonged to the Styria region and is now included in the Drava Statistical Region.

Name
The name of the settlement was changed from Cerovec to Cerovec Stanka Vraza in 1980.

Cultural heritage
The village is the birthplace of Stanko Vraz, after whom it was renamed (as well as to differentiate it from a number of other settlements in Slovenia named Cerovec). The house in which Vraz was born in 1810 is preserved and a commemorative plaque was unveiled on it in 1951.

References

External links 
Cerovec Stanka Vraza on Geopedia

Populated places in the Municipality of Ormož